Daniel Chapman Stillson (March 25, 1826 – August 23, 1899) was an American inventor. He invented the modern adjustable pipe wrench.

Biography
He was born March 25, 1826 in Durham, New Hampshire. He was the son of William Stillson and Nancy Chapman. He married Ellen Raynes Davis on April 18, 1855.

He was a machinist during the American Civil War and served on David Glasgow Farraguts first voyage as a vice admiral. At the end of the Civil War, Stillson returned to Charlestown, Massachusetts, and eventually he moved to Somerville, Massachusetts. He then worked as a machinist at the J. J. Walworth Company in the Cambridgeport section of Cambridge, Massachusetts. While at the J. J. Walworth Company, he developed his pipe wrench. On September 13, 1870, he was issued his patent. Stillson was paid about $80,000 in royalties during his lifetime.

He died on August 23, 1899, and is buried at Mount Auburn Cemetery in Cambridge and Watertown, Massachusetts.

Patent

References

1826 births
1899 deaths
People from Durham, New Hampshire
People from Somerville, Massachusetts
Burials at Mount Auburn Cemetery
19th-century American inventors